The 2022–23 Iraq FA Cup is the 33rd edition of the Iraqi knockout football cup as a clubs-only competition, the main domestic cup in Iraqi football, featuring clubs from the top three tiers of the Iraqi football league system (Iraqi Premier League, Iraq Division One and Iraq Division Two). The competition begins on 1 November 2022 with the first round.

Schedule 
The rounds of the 2022–23 competition are scheduled as follows:

First round 
Masafi Al-Junoob, Al-Ghadhriya and Afak received byes to the second round.
Baghdad Section

Northern Section

Southern Section

Central Euphrates Section

Western Section

Second round 
Al-Jaish, Ghaz Al-Shamal, Rabia, Al-Minaa, Al-Bahri, Samarra, and Diyala received byes to the third round.
Baghdad Section

Northern Section

Southern Section

Central Euphrates Section

Western Section

Third round
Baghdad Section

Northern Section

Southern Section

Central Euphrates Section

Western Section

Third round play-off
Baghdad Section

Central Euphrates Section

Round of 32 
20 top-tier teams and 12 lower-tier teams compete in this round.

References

External links
 Iraq Football Association

 
Cup
2022–23 Asian domestic association football cups